Maryna Vitaliyivna Chernyshova (born 25 June 1999) is an inactive Ukrainian tennis player.

Chernyshova has career-high WTA rankings of 280 in singles, achieved September 2019, and No. 371 in doubles, which she reached on 14 May 2018.

She won her biggest ITF title to date at the 2019 Zagreb Ladies Open by beating Réka Luca Jani in the final, in straight sets.

ITF finals

Singles: 12 (9 titles, 3 runner-ups)

Doubles: 15 (9 titles, 6 runner-ups)

References

External links
 
 

1999 births
Living people
Ukrainian female tennis players
21st-century Ukrainian women